Connie Cato (born March 30, 1955) is a country music singer. Signed to Capitol Records, Cato released three studio albums in the 1970s and several singles including the top twenty hit "Hurt" in 1975. She stopped recording in the early 1980s.

Discography

Albums

Singles

References

1955 births
American women country singers
American country singer-songwriters
Musicians from St. Louis
Living people
Singer-songwriters from Missouri
Country musicians from Missouri
21st-century American women